Saint Kitts and Nevis Red Cross Society was established in 1942 as a branch of the British Red Cross. It was recognised as a separate national Red Cross Society in 1985.

It has its headquarters in Basseterre.

References

External links

 Official Facebook page

Organizations established in 1942
Medical and health organisations based in Saint Kitts and Nevis
Red Cross and Red Crescent national societies
1940s establishments in Saint Kitts and Nevis
1942 establishments in the British Empire